Manca Pislak (born 9 September 1997) is a Slovenian tennis player.

On 3 April 2017, she achieved a career-high singles ranking of world No. 500. Pislac has won three singles and three doubles titles on the ITF Women's Circuit.

Playing for the Slovenia Fed Cup team, she has a win–loss record of 3–0.

Career

Junior years
Pislak has a career-high ITF juniors ranking of 52, achieved on 2 February 2015.

Professional career

ITF finals

Singles: 6 (3–3)

Doubles: 9 (4–5)

ITF Junior Circuit finals

Singles (1–1)

Doubles (4–4)

National representation

Fed Cup
Pislak made her Fed Cup debut for Slovenia in 2015, while the team was competing in the Europe/Africa Zone Group II.

Fed Cup (3–0)

Doubles (3–0)

External links
 
 
 

1997 births
Living people
Slovenian female tennis players
Sportspeople from Ljubljana
Competitors at the 2018 Mediterranean Games
Mediterranean Games competitors for Slovenia